Fratello may refer to:

People:
Fratello Metallo ("Brother Metal"), a name given to Cesare Bonizzi (born 1946), Capuchin friar and heavy metal singer
Jose Luis Fratello (born 1987), the top lieutenant of the Mexican gang called La Línea, the armed wing of the Juárez Cartel
Mike Fratello (born 1947), American color analyst and a professional basketball coach
Rosanna Fratello (born 1951), Italian singer and actress

Other:
Grande Fratello, the Italian version of reality television franchise Big Brother, began in September 2000
San Fratello, a comune in the Province of Messina in the Italian region of Sicily
San Fratello horse, an Italian light horse breed that originated in San Fratello, Sicily